Wisconsin Islands is a group of a dozen or more small rocky islands which lie  northeast of Largo Island in the northeast part of the Duroch Islands. Named after the University of Wisconsin–Madison, Madison, Wisconsin. The name was applied by Martin Halpern, leader of the University of Wisconsin field party which geologically mapped these islands, 1961–62.

See also 
 List of Antarctic and sub-Antarctic islands

Notes

Islands of the Duroch Islands
University of Wisconsin–Madison